Peter D. Easton is the Notre Dame Alumni Professor of Accountancy, and serves as Academic Director, for the Center for Accounting Research and Education, at University of Notre Dame.

Bibliography
 Financial & Managerial Accounting for MBAs
 Custom MBA Financial Accounting Placement Course (SMU)
 Financial Accounting for MBAs
 Valuation Using Financial Statements

References

University of Notre Dame faculty
Living people
Year of birth missing (living people)
Place of birth missing (living people)
University of Adelaide alumni